"I'll Tell the Man in the Street" is a song first introduced by Dennis King in the 1938 stage musical I Married an Angel.

The song was written by Richard Rodgers and Lorenz Hart.

Other Recordings

Nelson Eddy
Nelson Eddy performed the song with additional lyrics by Bob Wright and Chet Forrest in the film version of I Married An Angel.

Barbra Streisand
Barbra Streisand recorded the song for her debut solo album The Barbra Streisand Album in 1963.

Kristin Chenoweth
Kristin Chenoweth recorded the song for her 2001 solo album Let Yourself Go.

References

Songs about streets
1938 songs
Barbra Streisand songs
Songs with music by Richard Rodgers
Songs with lyrics by Lorenz Hart